Hopeville is an unincorporated community in Doyle Township, Clarke County, Iowa, United States.

References

Unincorporated communities in Clarke County, Iowa
Unincorporated communities in Iowa